Philip Sugden (born April 1949) studied art in Paris under French painter, Arnaud D'Hauterives (winner Grand Prix de Rome). After graduating from the New York School of Visual Arts and the Paris American Academie des Beaux Arts in Paris, he made twelve journeys throughout the Himalaya and Tibet, including the Kingdom of Mustang and Ladakh. In May 2007, he and writer, Carole Elchert were married by Lama Nawang Tenzin at Tengboche Monastery near Mt. Everest.

In 1990, Philip and his wife were awarded grants from the Ohio Joint Projects in the Arts and Humanities and the National Endowment for the Humanities, to create a Public Television presentation and companion book based on their 1988 Cultural Arts Expedition to the Himalaya and Tibet.  They were guests of the Dalai Lama and the Tibetan Government in Exile, and spent six months in Tibetan communities throughout India, Nepal, Ladakh and Tibet gathering images and recordings for the production entitled, White Lotus, An Introduction to Tibetan Culture, (companion book published by Snow Lion 1991).  According to the 1991 articles from the Cleveland Plain Dealer and The Toledo Blade Sunday magazine articles, Sugden completed 165 ink drawings on location during that trip.

In 1991, Sugden co-organized the Dalai Lama's two-day visit to his home and studio in Findlay, Ohio. While there the Dalai Lama spoke at The University of Findlay, where Mr. Sugden was a part-time art faculty at the time. According to The Findlay Courier articles written at the time, the Dalai Lama visited Sugden's studio where he accepted one Sugden's drawings.

During that same year, Sugden was a guest curator at the Nicholas Roerich Museum in New York City, where he organized a six-month series of exhibitions, which included a solo show of works by Robert Rauschenberg, celebrating the 1991 International Year of Tibet. In the summer of 1998 Sugden was invited by, "Artists for Tibet," to mount a solo exhibition at the Denis Bibro Gallery in New York City as part of “Art Against Chinese Human Right Abuses.”

During his thirty-five-year career, Sugden's work has been exhibited in over one-hundred solo shows internationally including New York City, Los Angeles, London, Paris, Washington D.C., Melbourne, and Kathmandu.  Mr. Sugden became the first visual artist to be placed on the Marathon Performing Arts Center's "Wall of Fame" in 2019. He is the Co-Producer and Director of the Documentary, "Activismo: Art & Dissidence in Cuba," that focuses on five Cuban artists, including Tania Bruguera, who have been labeled as dissidents by the Cuban government. He is currently an Assistant Professor of Fine Arts at Bluffton University.

References

 The Cleveland Plain Dealer: March, 1991.  
 The Toledo Blade: March, 1991.  
 The Findlay Courier: February, 1991.  
 White Lotus; An Introduction to Tibetan Culture: Snow Lion Publications 1991.  
 Visions from the Fields of Merit; Drawings of Tibet and the Himalayas: Floating Temple Press 2000.

Living people
20th-century English painters
English male painters
21st-century English painters
People from Swanage
1949 births
20th-century English male artists
21st-century English male artists